

Ælfstan was a medieval Bishop of Rochester. He was consecrated sometime before 964. He died between 994 and 995.

Citations

References

External links
 

Bishops of Rochester
10th-century English bishops